The 1941 Colgate Red Raiders football team was an American football team that represented Colgate University as an independent during the 1941 college football season. In its 13th season under head coach Andrew Kerr, the team compiled a 3–3–2 record. The team played its home games at Colgate Athletic Field in Hamilton, New York.

Schedule

References

Colgate
Colgate Raiders football seasons
Colgate Red Raiders football